The Man from Death Valley is a 1931 American Western film directed by Lloyd Nosler and written by Lloyd Nosler and George Arthur Durlam. The film stars Tom Tyler. The film was released on September 9, 1931, by Monogram Pictures.

Cast          
Tom Tyler as Dave
John Oscar as Hank
Betty Mack as Ann
Gino Corrado as Ortego
Stanley Blystone as Sheriff Jeffries
Si Jenks as Bank Teller
Hank Bell as Deputy

References

External links
 

1931 films
American Western (genre) films
1931 Western (genre) films
Monogram Pictures films
American black-and-white films
1930s English-language films
Films directed by Lloyd Nosler
1930s American films